The Karakan Pine Forest is a Russian national forest situated in Siberia on the eastern coast of Novosibirsk Reservoir, 70 kilometers south from  Novosibirsk center.

External links 
 NATURE IN THE NOVOSIBIRSK REGION, A BRIEF GEOGRAPHICAL ACCOUNT

Nature reserves in Russia
Geography of Novosibirsk Oblast
Forests of Russia